The Friends of Cathedral Music (FCM) is a charity which seeks to maintain and expand the work of choral foundations of cathedrals, collegiate churches, chapels, and other appropriate places of worship in the United Kingdom and Ireland. To this end, it makes grants and distributes a number of publications.

History
The Friends of Cathedral Music was founded in 1956 by the Revd. Ronald Sibthorp at a meeting at St Bride's Church Fleet Street. It was prompted by a decision of the Provost of Southwell at Southwell Minster to abolish the Saturday choral evensong so that the lay clerks could watch the weekly football at Newark-on-Trent. There was also a similar incident at Truro Cathedral.

Sibthorp, in an effort to reverse the decline in interest in cathedral music after World War II, sought to create a promoting organisation the Cathedral Music Advisory Committee. However the committee failed to get off the ground, so he tried a new tack and sent a letter on 2 June 1956 that jump-started a new cathedral music organisation, The Friends of Cathedral Music. Until 1962 FCM met only once a year but because of the interest shown in FCM and due in a large part to the charismatic figure of Anthony (‘Tony’) Harvey the regular tour of the UK as is known in the present day was started.

Aims
The Friends of Cathedral Music makes grants to choirs as endowments in support of chorister scholarships, or the purchase of capital equipment such as rehearsal pianos. The aims as spelt out in 1958 were to:

 Widening public interest in cathedral services
 Supporting and encouraging cathedral chapters
 Restoring the pre-war levels of cathedral services
 Expanding to churches where there is no choir.

Publications
The Friends of Cathedral Music publishes:

Cathedral Music – a twice yearly magazine covering a wide range of subjects relevant to the objectives of the charity.
Singing in Cathedrals – a directory of choral services in choral foundations in Great Britain and Ireland.
Cathedral Voice – a twice yearly newsletter.

List of presidents

Martin Shaw 1956–1958
Herbert Howells 1958–1983
George Guest 1983–2002
Christopher Robinson 2004–

List of chairmen
Ronald Sibthorpe 1956–1971
Christopher Hugh Dearnley 1971–1990
Alan Thurlow 1990–2002
Professor Peter Toyne 2002–

Bibliography
Notes

References

External links
 

1956 establishments in the United Kingdom
Organizations established in 1956
Music charities based in the United Kingdom
Music organisations based in the United Kingdom
Non-profit organisations based in the United Kingdom
Charities based in the Republic of Ireland
British church music